Sushil Kumar Bhattacharya (30 November 1921 – 28 December 1996) was an Indian politician. He was elected to the Lok Sabha, the lower house of the Parliament of India from the Burdwan constituency of West Bengal in 1980 as a member of the Communist Party of India (Marxist).

References

External links
 Official biographical sketch in Parliament of India website

1921 births
1996 deaths
India MPs 1980–1984
Communist Party of India (Marxist) politicians from West Bengal
Lok Sabha members from West Bengal
People from Bardhaman